Rohit Sharma (born 9 May 1994) is an Indian cricketer who plays for Jammu & Kashmir. He made his first-class debut in the 2015–16 Ranji Trophy on 15 October 2015. He made his List A debut on 10 December 2015 in the 2015–16 Vijay Hazare Trophy. He made his Twenty20 debut on 2 January 2016 in the 2015–16 Syed Mushtaq Ali Trophy.

References

External links
 

1994 births
Living people
Indian cricketers
Jammu and Kashmir cricketers
People from Jammu